Scarlett Hill was a Canadian soap opera (first written for CBC Television) which ran from October 1962 to 1964. This was the first daytime soap opera produced for Canadian television, although it was based upon an American radio drama created by Robert and Kathleen Lindsay.

The series focused on the residents of a boarding house, and starred John Drainie, Ed McNamara, Gordon Pinsent, and Beth Lockerbie.

The series was syndicated to the United Kingdom, Australia and the US; in America, the show ran in syndication from 1965 to 1966 on a handful of stations.

Cast
The cast included:

 Ivor Barry: Walter Pendelton
 Suzanne Bryant: Janice Turner
 Beth Lockerbie: Kate Russell
 Ed McNamara: Harry
 Alan Pearce: Sidney
 Gordon Pinset: Dr. David Black
 Lucy Warner: Ginny

References

External links
 

1960s Canadian drama television series
CBC Television original programming
Canadian television soap operas
1962 Canadian television series debuts
1964 Canadian television series endings